Yvonne Cherrie (also known as Monalisa, born August 19, 1981) is a Tanzanian actress. In 2010 she won Zanzibar International Film Festival for the 'Best Actress' award. She was also nominated for 2011 Nigeria Entertainment Awards for Pan African Actress Of The Year. She is cited as the one of the best actresses and pioneers in the movie industry of Tanzania. She is also the founder of Act With Monalisa foundation which focus on to mentor and support young Tanzanian women with acting career guidance and a platform to showcase their talents and Director of African Women Arts and Film Festival (AWAFFEST).

Early life and education
Cherrie was born on August 19, 1981 at Muhimbili, the national hospital of Tanzania. Her mother, Suzan Lewis, is also an actress.

She had her early education at Luanda, Angola where her father was working; she later returned to Tanzania and started her primary education at Muungano Primary School in Temeke, Dar Es Salaam and she had secondary education at Zanaki Girls High School before heading to Tanzania Public Service College where she studied secretarial studies.

In 2002 she joined British Council Tanzania for Pre Advance level to study English language course, and after that she joined Wilnag Media Training College in Nairobi where she graduated with a diploma in mass communication.

Career
She got her nickname “Monalisa” from her 1998 performance as a young lady, struggling to reconcile her life with her multiple lovers, in the series Mambo Hayo. In 2002 Monalisa made her first feature film debut in the film called Girlfriend where she played as Tumpale a TID'S girlfriend Tumpale who is forced to turn her life around after being kicked out by her dad . She then played roles in many movies, such as Sabrina (2003), Dilemma (2004), She Is My Sister (2006), Kwa Heshima Ya Penzi, Binti Nusa and Network. One of her notable performances is from Black Sunday that earned her the 'Best Actress' award for the 2010 Zanzibar International Film Festival and nomination for Pan African Actress of The year 2011 Nigeria Entertainment Awards.

Filmography

TV series

Stage Plays

Film

Awards and nominations

References

External links
 

Living people
1981 births
People from Dar es Salaam
Tanzanian television actresses
Tanzanian stage actresses
Tanzanian film actresses
20th-century Tanzanian actresses
21st-century Tanzanian actresses